Scoggins Creek, formerly known as "Scoggin Creek", is a  tributary of the Tualatin River in Tillamook and Washington counties in the U.S. state of Oregon. It is named for pioneer settler Gustavus Scoggin.

Surrounded by lava and basalt flows and layers of sandstone, it flows generally southeast from near South Saddle Mountain in the Northern Oregon Coast Range and through a -wide valley to Henry Hagg Lake, an impoundment of Scoggins Dam.

The five named tributaries of Scoggins Creek from source to mouth are Fisher, Parsons, Wall, Tanner, and Sain creeks. Wall, Tanner, and Sain enter at Hagg Lake.

See also
List of rivers of Oregon

References

External links

The Tualatin Riverkeepers
The Tualatin River Watershed Council

Rivers of Oregon
Rivers of Tillamook County, Oregon
Rivers of Washington County, Oregon